"That Smell" is a song by the Southern rock band Lynyrd Skynyrd. Written by Ronnie Van Zant and guitarist Allen Collins, it was released in 1977 on the album Street Survivors. At the time the song was written, the band had been using alcohol, cocaine, and heroin. Van Zant said that he started using heroin and cocaine to relieve the pressure of performing in front of large audiences.

Van Zant's inspiration for the song was the increasing reckless indulgences of the band members culminating in the evening when guitarist Gary Rossington crashed his Ford Torino into an oak tree along Mandarin Road in Jacksonville, Florida,  after excessive consumption of alcohol and other drugs. Van Zant was thus inspired to write the song as a warning about the consequences of careless overuse of drugs and alcohol. The song earned Rossington the moniker "Prince Charming" from Van Zant. Later when asked, Van Zant said, "I had a creepy feeling things were going against us, so I thought I'd blow lines, slam some H and write a morbid song."  The lyrics cautioned that "tomorrow might not be here for you", and that "the smell of death surrounds you". Three days after the album was released, the band was devastated by a plane crash. The crash killed several members of Lynyrd Skynyrd, including Van Zant.

"That Smell" was the second single released from Street Survivors and failed to chart.

The song is featured in the films Blow (2001), Joe Dirt (2001) and Wild Hogs (2007), at the end of the fourth episode of the HBO television drama series True Blood (2008). The song appeared in the first season of Entourage. It also appeared in the twenty-first episode of the second season of Miami Vice (1984), and the Universal Studios Florida attraction Disaster!.

References

External links
 

1977 songs
Lynyrd Skynyrd songs
Songs about alcohol
Songs about drugs
Song recordings produced by Tom Dowd
Songs written by Allen Collins
Songs written by Ronnie Van Zant